Taenaris horsfieldii, the big eyed jungle lady or silky owl, is a butterfly of the family Nymphalidae.

Subspecies
Taenaris horsfieldii horsfieldi (Java)
Taenaris horsfieldii birchi Distant, 1883 (Peninsular Malaya: Johore)
Taenaris horsfieldii occulta Grose-Smith, 1889 (Borneo)
Taenaris horsfieldii plateni Staudinger, 1889 (Palawan)

Description
Upperside of forewings is pale fuscous, while hindwings are greyish white, with a large ocellated spot, of which the centre is blackish with a pale central eye, broadly surrounded with ochraceous. Underside of the forewings is darker towards base and hindwings have a larger and brighter ocellated spot.

Distribution and habitat
This species can be found on Java, Peninsular Malaysia, Borneo and the Philippines (Palawan). It is a species of both primary and secondary forest.

References

Butterflies described in 1820
Taenaris
Butterflies of Borneo
Butterflies of Java